Greeley is a surname. Notable people with the surname include:

Andrew Greeley (1928–2013), American priest, sociologist, and author
Arthur White Greeley (1875–1904), American physiologist and ichthyologist
Elam Greeley, (1818–1882), American politician
George Greeley (1917–2007), Italian-American pianist and conductor
Horace Greeley (1811–1872), American newspaper editor, reformer and politician 
Isabel Greeley (1843–1928), American educator 
Jimmy Greeley (born 1945), Irish radio presenter
Julia Greeley (birth year uncertain, died 1918), African-American ex-slave and philanthropist
Jonathan Greeley (1741–1781), American sea captain
Martin Greeley (1814–1899), American politician
Ronald Greeley (1939–2011), American geologist and planetary scientist
Samuel Arnold Greeley (1882-1968), American civil engineer
William B. Greeley (1879–1955), American forester, third chief of the US Forest Service

See also
 Greeley (disambiguation)
Horace Greeley (disambiguation)
 Greely (disambiguation)